Narsi Raniga (born 1942) is a Fiji Indian who has held senior civil service posts in Fiji and has also been a member of the House of Representatives of Fiji.

He was born in Ba and completed the Bachelor of Arts from the University of Queensland. After a brief period as a teacher, he did postgraduate courses at the University of Auckland and Cambridge University. On his return to Fiji, he joined the civil service and held numerous government posts, including overseas service in the diplomatic corps and head of various government departments.

In 1987 he resigned from the civil service to contest the South Central National Constituency for the Alliance Party. He won the seat with a comfortable margin, but his party lost the election and he sat on the opposition bench for a month when the military coup of 1987 prematurely ended his political career.

References 

Alliance Party (Fiji) politicians
Indian members of the House of Representatives (Fiji)
Fijian Hindus
University of Queensland alumni
1943 births
Living people
Politicians from Ba (town)